Samuel Souprayen (born 18 February 1989) is a French professional footballer who plays for Bulgarian club Botev Plovdiv. He plays as a centre back capable of playing on the left side of defense, as well. He is a former France youth international having earned caps with the under-18, under-19, under-20, and under-21 teams. Souprayen played with the under-20 team at the 2009 Mediterranean Games.

Club career
Souprayen was born in Saint-Benoît, Réunion, but grew in the city of Lyon in the Rhône-Alpes region. He began his football career with CASCOL Oullins in the commune of Oullins. He later joined the youth academy of Stade Rennais. At Rennes, he was captain of both the youth sides that won the under-18 championship for the 2006–07 season, and the Coupe Gambardella in 2008. On 17 July 2008, he signed his first professional contract agreeing to a three-year deal through 2011. He was officially promoted to the senior team for the 2008–09 season and was assigned the number 4 shirt by manager Guy Lacombe.

Though on the first team, Souprayen only saw playing time with the club's Championnat de France amateur team appearing in 31 matches, starting 30 of them, helping the side finish 1st among professional clubs in their group, thus qualifying for the playoffs, where they lost to Lyon in the semi-finals. After playing with the reserves for the first four matches of the 2009–10 season, Rennes decided it would be best to send the player on loan to Ligue 2 club Dijon FCO for the entire season. At Dijon, Souprayen was assigned the number 19 shirt and made his professional debut on 11 September in the club's 1–0 win over Bastia playing the entire 90 minutes.

Following the season, on 15 May, Rennes manager Frédéric Antonetti confirmed that Souprayen would return to the team and that he would be heavily relied upon for the 2010–11 season. On 21 July, Rennes rewarded the player with a two-year contract extension tying him to the club until 2013. After featuring in only 16 league matches in the 2010–11 season, in June 2011, Souprayen signed a four-year contract with newly promoted first division club Dijon. The defender had previously spent the 2009–10 season on loan at the club.

On 17 August 2018, Souprayen signed with French club Auxerre.

On 23 July 2021, Souprayen signed a two-year contract as a free agent with Bulgarian First League club Botev Plovdiv.

International career
Born in Réunion, Souprayen is of Malgasy descent. Souprayen has played with both the under-18 team and the under-19 team playing with the squad that fail to qualify for the 2008 UEFA European Under-19 Football Championship. On 26 May 2009, he was named to the under-20 squad to play in the 2009 Mediterranean Games. He participated in two of the team's four matches as France finished in 4th-place position.

References

External links
 
 

1989 births
Living people
Footballers from Lyon
French footballers
France under-21 international footballers
France youth international footballers
French sportspeople of Malagasy descent
Association football defenders
Footballers from Réunion
Ligue 1 players
Ligue 2 players
Serie A players
Serie B players
First Professional Football League (Bulgaria) players
Stade Rennais F.C. players
Dijon FCO players
Hellas Verona F.C. players
Botev Plovdiv players
French expatriate footballers
French expatriate sportspeople in Italy
Expatriate footballers in Italy
French expatriate sportspeople in Bulgaria
Expatriate footballers in Bulgaria
Competitors at the 2009 Mediterranean Games
Mediterranean Games competitors for France